Asgar Baig (born 23 October 1971) is an Indian first-class cricketer who represented Rajasthan. He made his first-class debut for Rajasthan in the 1991-92 Ranji Trophy on 5 December 1991.

References

External links
 

1971 births
Living people
Indian cricketers
Rajasthan cricketers